Butterfly Love is the debut studio album of Steel Pole Bath Tub, released in 1989 by Boner Records.

Track listing

Personnel 
Adapted from the Butterfly Love liner notes.

Steel Pole Bath Tub
 Dale Flattum – bass guitar, sampler, vocals
 Mike Morasky – guitar, tape, vocals
 Darren Morey (as D.K. Mor-X) – drums, guitar, tambourine

Production and additional personnel
 Jonathan Burnside – engineering
 Steel Pole Bath Tub – production

Release history

References

External links 
 

1989 debut albums
Boner Records albums
Steel Pole Bath Tub albums